Colaspis bridarollii is a species of leaf beetle from South America. It was first described by the Czech entomologist Jan Bechyné in 1949, and was dedicated to the Argentine Jesuit entomologist Albino Juan Bridarolli. It is one of the main pests of potatoes in Buenos Aires Province, Argentina; it was first reported attacking potatoes in the region in 1997.

Distribution
In Argentina, C. bridarollii is recorded from Santiago del Estero, Buenos Aires, Córdoba, Entre Ríos, Misiones, Santa Fe and Chaco. It is also recorded from Paraguay, Uruguay and Brazil.

References

Eumolpinae
Beetles described in 1949
Beetles of South America